Fashtakeh (also known as Fashtakeh-ye Avval) is a village in Chapar Khaneh Rural District, Khomam District, Rasht County, Gilan Province, Iran. At the 2006 census, its population was 1,824, in 550 families.

References 

Populated places in Rasht County